The Lassonde School of Engineering is the professional engineering school of York University in Toronto, Ontario, Canada. Lassonde incorporates crossover programming with York University’s Schulich School of Business and Osgoode Hall Law School to study and business and law, respectively, alongside the engineering program.

The Lassonde School of Engineering was established in November 2011 with funding from founding donor Pierre Lassonde, the Government of Ontario and York University. Students from the Faculty of Science and Engineering formally joined the Lassonde School of Engineering on May 1, 2013.

On April 8, 2016, Bergeron Centre for Engineering Excellence opened. The building, designed by Greg Woods for ZAS Architects has no lecture halls and is modelled after the flipped classroom concept. The façade was designed by Dieter Janssen in collaboration with Mesh Consultants and Blackwell Engineering.

History 
The Lassonde School of Engineering was created in November 2011. In May 2013, students and faculty members in the Department of Electrical Engineering and Computer Science and the Department of Earth & Space Science & Engineering (both previously part of the Faculty of Science and Engineering at York University) joined the Lassonde School of Engineering.

In September 2013, the first group of new first-years, comprising 397 students, joined the Lassonde School, including the first students in the new Electrical Engineering program. In September 2014, the first students in Lassonde's new mechanical engineering and civil engineering programs enrolled.

The Lassonde School of Engineering began a 50-50 initiative to have a student body that is 50% female and 50% male.

In April 2016, the Bergeron Centre for Engineering Excellence was officially opened. The Lassonde School of Engineering has a philosophy which focuses on creating "well-rounded" engineers.

In October 2015, the Lassonde School of Engineering accepted $1.5 million from IFlytek to create a neural computing and machine learning research laboratory. The same company was later placed on a Bureau of Industry and Security blacklist for allegedly enabling human rights abuses in Xinjiang with its technology.

Undergraduate programs 

Engineering

The following programs are accredited by the Canadian Engineering Accreditation Board:

 B.Eng - Civil Engineering
 B.Eng - Computer Engineering
 B.Eng - Electrical Engineering
 B.Eng - Geomatics Engineering
 B.Eng - Mechanical Engineering
 B.Eng - Software Engineering
 B.Eng - Space Engineering

Computing

 BSc, BA, iBSc, iBA - Computer Science (Accredited by the Computer Science Accreditation Council)
 BSc, BA - Computer Security (Accredited by the Computer Science Accreditation Council)
 BA - Digital Media (offered jointly with the Faculty of Fine Arts)

Earth & Space Science

 BSc - Earth & Atmospheric Science
 BSc - Space Science

Graduate programs 

 Civil Engineering (MASc & PhD)
Computer Science (MSc & PhD)
Electrical Engineering (MASc & PhD)
Computer Engineering (MASc & PhD)
Software Engineering (MASc & PhD)
Earth & Space Science (MSc & PhD)
Mechanical Engineering (MASc & PhD)

References 

Engineering
Engineering universities and colleges in Canada
2011 establishments in Ontario